Polyarush or Poliaroush is a gender-neutral Slavic surname. Notable people with the surname include:

Dmitri Poliaroush (born 1970), Belarusian gymnast
Oleg Polyarush (born 1977), Ukrainian football player

Slavic-language surnames